The men's 3000 metres steeplechase at the 2021 World Athletics U20 Championships was held at the Kasarani Stadium on 22 August.

Records

Results
The final was held on 22 August at 16:05.

References

3000 metres steeplechase
Steeplechase at the World Athletics U20 Championships